St Mary Street and High Street are major commercial streets in the Castle Quarter of Cardiff city centre, Wales, which form a major thoroughfare running south from the gatehouse of Cardiff Castle.  High Street begins at the junction of Castle Street on the A4161 and ends at the junction of Church Street and Quay Street, from where St Mary Street begins until the roundabout at Callaghan Square on the A4160.

In the 21st century, the thoroughfare has become the location for a wide variety of pubs, bars, restaurants, cafes and coffeeshops.

Notable buildings past and present

Present buildings
 House of Fraser, formerly Howells department store
 Cardiff Market
 Hodge House 
 Prince of Wales Theatre (now a pub)
 High Street Arcade
 Morgan Arcade
 Royal Arcade
 Royal Hotel

Former buildings

 Cardiff Town Hall, demolished
 Cardiff Gaol, demolished to make way for Cardiff Market
 The first Cardiff Free Library was located above the St. Mary Street entrance to the Royal Arcade
 YMCA building

Public art
 Statue of the Second Marquess of Bute, located in the street from 1853 until 1999, when it moved to Bute Square.
 The former Pierhead Clock, installed in a glass box with three monkeys striking the chimes, near the Royal Hotel in 2011.

Notes

External links 
 
 Official website of 'Changing landscapes: Improving St Mary Street and High Street'

Shopping streets in Wales
Streets in Cardiff
High Streets